Daniela Hantuchová and Ai Sugiyama were defending champions, but withdrew due to Sugiyama's right toe injury.

Seeds

 Daniela Hantuchová Ai Sugiyama (withdrew due to Sugiyama's right toe injury)
 Anna-Lena Grönefeld   Meghann Shaughnessy (semifinals)
 Janette Husárová   Květa Peschke (quarterfinals)
 Anabel Medina Garrigues   Sania Mirza (withdrew due to Mirza's right knee injury)

Draw

Draw

External links
Main & Qualifying Draw

Qatar Ladies Open - Singles
Qatar Ladies Open
2007 in Qatari sport